is a Japanese actress.

Biography
She was born in Osaka. In early 1984, the Japanese movie studio Toho Company Ltd. held their first Toho Cinderella beauty contest, and Yasuko, almost 19 at the time, was chosen as the first Toho Cinderella, beating out the other 30,000 contestants.

Shortly after, she made her film debut in the film Karate Cop III: Song of the Sea, before co-starring as the heroine Naoko Okumura in The Return of Godzilla, which was the grand comeback film for the famous movie monster Godzilla.  She appeared in the next Godzilla film 5 years later, 1989's Godzilla vs. Biollante, but as another character (Erika Shiragami, who later becomes Godzilla's titular adversary). At the Toho Cinderella beauty contest that same year, she took place with the 2nd Toho Cinderella, 1987 winner Megumi Odaka (who was also in Biollante, starting her Miki Saegusa character).

She has since appeared in numerous movies and television (her TV show debut was Miotsukushi in 1985), and is considered one of Japan's most beautiful and talented actresses. She has played scientific criminal investigator Mariko Sakaki, the lead role in the television show Kasōken no Onna (and its successor Shin Kasōken no Onna), which have aired on TV Asahi since 1999. In NHK Taiga dramas she has portrayed Iroha-hime in the Dokuganryū Masamune (1987), Akahashi Tōko in Taiheiki (1991), and Nene in Hideyoshi (1996).  She starred as Rui in the jidaigeki Shin On'yado Kawasemi (TV Asahi, 1997). She has also played the villain in one episode of Furuhata Ninzaburo in 1996.

She also voiced Chihiro's mother in the original Japanese version of Spirited Away. This involved her sounding as though she was talking with her mouth full, so she initially tried biting her finger while acting. When this didn't create the desired effect, some KFC chicken was ordered into the recording studio.

Filmography

Television

Film

Awards

References

External links
Yasuko Sawaguchi at Toho Entertainment

1965 births
Living people
Japanese actresses
People from Sakai, Osaka
Asadora lead actors